Mister Supranational 2021 was the 5th edition of the Mister Supranational pageant. It was held on August 22, 2021 in Nowy Sącz, Poland. Nate Crnkovich of the United States crowned Varo Vargas of Peru as his successor at the end of the event. This edition marks the first time in history that Peru won the Mister Supranational pageant, the second South American country and the third Latin American country to do so. 

The edition was originally scheduled at the end of 2020 but was postponed due to the global COVID-19 pandemic.

Background
On 14 April 2021, Gerhard Parzutka von Lipinski, the president of Miss and Mister Supranational, announced that Mister Supranational 2021 is scheduled to be held on 22 August in Strzelecki Park Amphitheater, Nowy Sącz, Małopolska, Poland.

Results

Notes:
§ – placed into the Top 10 by fan-voting challenge
Δ – placed into the Top 20 by fast-track challenges

Continental Titleholders

Special awards

Order of announcements

Top 20

Top 10

Top 5

Challenge events

Supra Chat

Round 1

Final Result
The winner of Supra Chat will automatically advance to the Top 20 semifinalists of Mister Supranational 2021.

Top Model 
The winner of Top Model will automatically advance to the Top 20 semifinalists of Mister Supranational 2021.

Supra Fan Vote
The winner of the Supra Fan Vote will automatically advance to the Top 10 finalists of Mister Supranational 2021.

Mister Talent

Notes

Debut

Returns
Last competed in 2016:
 

Last competed in 2018:

Withdrawals
  – Phimmasone Singsavanh did not compete in the fifth edition due to the new coronavirus (COVID-19) visa restrictions.
  – Malaysia was set to debut in this edition however the Malaysia's representative, Wan Mohammad Aiman was unable to compete due to having problems with visa restrictions.
  – Jean-Laurent David did not compete in the fifth edition due to the new coronavirus (COVID-19) visa restrictions.
  – Glaucio Stekkel in the fifth edition due to the new coronavirus (COVID-19) visa restrictions.

References

External links 
 

2021
2021 beauty pageants